Revisioned: Tomb Raider (trademarked as Re\Visioned: Tomb Raider) is a ten-part animated series created by Ricardo Sanchez and based on the Tomb Raider series. It was released on the Turner Broadcasting's online video game service GameTap from July 10 to November 13, 2007. The series consists of various animation and comic book talents' renditions of Lara Croft, presented in the form of animated episodes. Minnie Driver voices Lara Croft in all episodes. The first three episodes present a linked story arc called "Keys to the Kingdom". Other episodes tell stories of single or multiple episodes that function as an anthology. The art style and storytelling vary in each episode depending on the writer and designer.

Episodes list

Development
Inspired by a project called "A Day in the Extra Life" by GameTap, the ReVisioned concept was created to explore and re-imagine well-known video game franchises while telling different stories of video game characters. Lara Croft was chosen for the first of the series. Comic book writers Warren Ellis, Brian Pulido, Peter Chung, Jim Lee and Gail Simone were chosen to write episodes for the season. Lee, a fan of the games, co-wrote the last episode "A Complicated Woman". Simone stated that she was intrigued by Lara Croft for being a strong female character like Wonder Woman. Thus, she was interested in a background story of the character before she became the Tomb Raider, which is reflected in "Pre-Teen Raider". Chung said that he was not familiar to the video games, but explained that he took advantage of the chance to work under ideal conditions and tell the story he wanted. After his research, he realized that Croft was trying to reclaim a relic before someone with a bad plan first reached it, and reversed these roles in the first three episodes. Ellis likened Croft to Allan Quatermain. Pulido, writer of "The Revenge of the Aztec Mummy" and "Lara Croft: Legacy", opined that he was impressed by Croft for being "a hot chick with guns", and he referred to Tex Avery cartoons during the writing process. While the production team had great creative freedom, they were given a basic guideline for the character by the developers so that Lara would not do anything out of character.

Potential spin-off
In December 2021, Gail Simone revealed on Twitter that there was a discussion with Warner Bros. about making a series based on the episode she wrote.

References

External links

IGN news articles
Q&A: GameTap's Sanchez Talks Tomb Raider Re\Visioned
Pre-Teen Raider Cartoon on GameTap Tomorrow at 1UP.com

Animated series based on video games
Works based on Tomb Raider